HNF1A antisense RNA 1 is a protein that in humans is encoded by the HNF1A-AS1 gene.

References

Further reading